is a Japanese multinational conglomerate holding company headquartered in Minato, Tokyo which focuses on investment management. The Group primarily invests in companies operating in technology that offer goods and services to customers in a multitude of markets and industries ranging from the internet to automation. With over $100 billion in capital at its onset, SoftBank’s Vision Fund is the world's largest technology-focused venture capital fund. Fund investors included sovereign wealth funds from countries in the Middle East.

The company is known for the leadership of its controversial founder and largest shareholder Masayoshi Son. Its investee companies, subsidiaries and divisions, including several unprofitable unicorns, operate in robotics, artificial intelligence, logistics, transportation, proptech, real estate, hospitality, broadband, fixed-line telecommunications, e-commerce, information technology, finance, media and marketing, and other areas. Among its biggest and most internationally recognizable current stockholdings are sizeable stakes in Arm (semiconductors), Alibaba (e-commerce), OYO Rooms (hospitality), WeWork (coworking) and Deutsche Telekom (telecommunications). SoftBank Corporation, its spun-out affiliate and former flagship business, is the third-largest wireless carrier in Japan, with 45.621 million subscribers as of March 2021.

SoftBank was ranked in the 2017 Forbes Global 2000 list as the 36th largest public company in the world and the second-largest publicly traded company in Japan after Toyota.

The logo of SoftBank is based on the flag of the Kaientai, a naval trading company founded in 1865, near the end of the Tokugawa shogunate, by Sakamoto Ryōma.

Although SoftBank does not affiliate itself to any traditional keiretsu, it has close ties with Mizuho Financial Group, its primary lender.

History

Founding and early years
SoftBank was founded in September 1981 as SOFTBANK Corp by then-24-year-old Masayoshi Son, initially as a software distributor. The company entered the publishing business in May 1982 with the launches of the Oh! PC and Oh! MZ magazines, about NEC and Sharp computers respectively. Oh!PC had a circulation of 140,000 copies by 1989. It would go on to become Japan's largest publisher of computer and technology magazines and trade shows.

In 1994, the company went public, valued at $3 billion. In September 1995, SoftBank agreed  to purchase US-based Ziff Davis publishing for $2.1 billion.

1995–2009 expansion
In the 1990s, Son made large investments in internet services and the so-called new economy in general. SoftBank bought COMDEX from The Interface Group on 1 April 1995 for $800 million and ZDI on 29 February 1996. SoftBank sold COMDEX to Key3Media, a spin-off of Ziff Davis, in 2001. In 1996, SoftBank formed a joint venture with American internet company Yahoo!, creating Yahoo! Japan, which would become a dominant site in the country.

In another highly publicized investment, SoftBank bought 80% of memory manufacturers Kingston Technology in 1996. When the owners-founders (John Tu and David Sun) announced plans to distribute $100,000,000 of the $1.5B windfall to Kingston employees, it created a very high profile media stir that lasted well thru the 1996 Christmas season; it was on all US networks, as well as international media. A few years later, in 1999, after the market for memory softened substantially, SoftBank sold the company back at a loss to the original owners for about a third of the original price.

In October 1999, SoftBank became a holding company. In 2000, SoftBank made its most successful investment$20 million to a then-fledgling Chinese Internet venture called Alibaba. This investment turned into $60 billion when Alibaba went public in September 2014.

In February 2000, SoftBank Ventures Asia was founded under the leadership of Masayoshi Son to focus on investment in Korean-based Internet companies.
On 28 January 2005, SoftBank became the owner of the Fukuoka SoftBank Hawks, a Nippon Professional Baseball team. On 17 March 2006, SoftBank announced its agreement to buy Vodafone Japan, giving it a stake in Japan's $78 billion mobile markets. In April 2006, SoftBank purchased a 23% stake in Betfair, an Internet betting exchange. In August 2006, SoftBank sold all its shares of SBI Group to a subsidiary of SBI's holding company, making SBI independent. On 1 October 2006, Vodafone Japan changed its corporate name and service brand name to "SoftBank Mobile" and "SoftBank" respectively.

On 28 January 2008, it was announced that SoftBank and Tiffany & Co. collaborated in making a limited 10 model-only phone. This phone contains more than 400 platinum diamonds, totaling more than 20 carats. The cost is said to be more than 100,000,000 yen.

2010–2016 acquisitions
On 3 February 2010, SoftBank acquired 13.7% in Ustream. On 1 October 2010, Ayumi Hamasaki became the commercial spokesperson.

On 3 October 2012, the takeover of competitor eAccess was announced. On 1 July 2013, SoftBank announced that Willcom was a wholly-owned subsidiary, after the termination of rehabilitation proceedings. eAccess was merged with Willcom, which resulted in a new subsidiary and brand from Yahoo! Japan, Ymobile Corporation.

On 15 October 2012, SoftBank announced plans to take control of American Sprint Nextel by purchasing a 70% stake for $20 billion. On 6 July 2013, the United States Federal Communications Commission approved SoftBank's acquisition for $22.2 billion for a 78% ownership interest in Sprint. On 6 August 2013, SoftBank bought 2% more shares of Sprint Corporation, increasing its ownership stake to 80%.

In October 2013, SoftBank acquired a 51% stake in Supercell for a reported $2.1 billion. Later on 25 October 2014, they invested $210 million in OlaCabs, $627 million in Snapdeal with a 30% stake in the company on 28 October 2014, and a $100 million investment in Housing.com for a 30% stake in November 2014.

In 2013, the company bought a controlling stake in French company Aldebaran Robotics, which was rebranded SoftBank Robotics. In 2014, teams from both companies co-designed Pepper, a humanoid robot. In 2015, SoftBank increased its stake to 95%.

In 2015, SoftBank acquired DramaFever. In May 2015, Masayoshi Son said he would appoint Nikesh Arora, a former Google executive, as Representative Director and President of SoftBank. Arora had been heading SoftBank's investment arm. On 1 June 2015, SoftBank acquired an additional 22.7% stake in Supercell, increasing its total stake to 73.2% and becoming the sole external shareholder of the company. In June 2015, SoftBank announced it would invest US$1 billion in the Korean e-commerce website Coupang as part of its overseas expansion plans.

In July 2015, SoftBank announced the renaming of the company from SoftBank Corp to SoftBank Group Corp. Meanwhile, SoftBank Mobile was renamed to SoftBank Corp, the now-former name of the company as a whole. On 16 February 2016, SoftBank announced they would repurchase a record 14.2% of shares, valued at $4.4bn, to boost investor confidence. On 31 March 2016, they announced they would sell shares worth $7.9 billion of their stake in Alibaba Group. On 21 June 2016, SoftBank sold its 84% stake in Supercell for a reported US$7.3 billion to Tencent. On 3 June 2016, Softbank agreed to sell most of its stake in GungHo Online Entertainment (approximately 23.47%) for about $685 million, ending Softbank's majority ownership. The offer was completed by 22 June.

In June 2016, Nikesh Arora stepped down amidst pressure from investors. Board member Ron Fisher and Baer Capital Partners founder Alok Sama undertook Arora's overseas investment duties. One month later, Son announced the company's largest deal ever to buy British chip designer ARM Holdings for more than US$32 billion. This acquisition was completed on 5 September 2016.

On 6 December 2016, after meeting with US President-elect Donald Trump, chief executive Masayoshi Son announced SoftBank would be investing US$50 billion in the United States toward businesses creating 50,000 new jobs.

2017–2018
On 30 January 2017, the Wall Street Journal wrote that SoftBank Group was "weighing an investment of well over $1 billion in shared-office space company WeWork, in what could be among the first deals from its new $100 billion technology fund." On 20 March, SoftBank bought a $300m stake in WeWork. On 14 February 2017, SoftBank Group agreed to buy Fortress Investment Group LLC for $3.3 billion. In February 2017, it was announced that Social Finance Inc. was close to raising $500 million from an investor group led by Silver Lake, including Softbank. On 28 March 2017, the Wall Street Journal reported that SoftBank Group Corporation had approached Didi Chuxing Technology Co. about investing $6 billion to help the ride-hailing firm expand in self-driving car technologies, with the bulk of the money to come from SoftBank's planned $100 billion Vision Fund.

On 18 May 2017, it was reported that Softbank had completed its single largest investment in India to date, investing $1.4 billion in Paytm. At the time, Softbank was also working on a takeover of Flipkart's Snapdeal. On 10 August 2017, Softbank invested $2.5 billion in Flipkart.

On 27 May 2017, Softbank and the Public Investment Fund of Saudi Arabia (PIF), the kingdom's main sovereign wealth fund, partnered to create the Softbank Vision Fund, the world's largest private equity fund with a capital of $93 billion. Softbank Group contributed $28 billion to the investment fund, of which $8.2 billion came from the sale of approximately 25% of British multinational Arm Holdings shares. Saudi Arabia is the principal investor in the fund, its Public Investment Fund (PIF) agreed to inject $45 billion into the Vision Fund over 5 years, becoming its largest investor. Other investors include Apple, Qualcomm, ARM, Foxconn, Sharp, Larry Ellison and Mubadala. The latter agreed to invest $15 billion dollars in the fund, targeting artificial intelligence, communications infrastructure, financial technology, consumer internet, mobile computing and robotics. Through Softbank Vision Fund, CEO Masayoshi Son explained his intent to invest in all companies developing technologies emphasizing global artificial intelligence, including sectors such as finance or transportation. In July 2019, SoftBank announced creating of a "Vision Fund 2", excluding participation from the Saudi Arabia government and including investors Apple, Foxconn, Microsoft and others. The fund is reported to focus on AI-based technology and invest approximately $108 billion, including $38 billion of its own funds. In February 2020, however, a report from Wall Street Journal stated the fund would only  up with less than half of that capital.

On 8 June 2017, Alphabet Inc. announced the sale of Boston Dynamics (robotics companies whose products include BigDog) to SoftBank Group for an undisclosed sum. On 25 August 2017, SoftBank finalized a $4.4 billion investment in WeWork. On 24 October 2017, Son announced the group would collaborate with Saudi Arabia to develop Neom, the new high-tech business and industrial city of the Saudi Kingdom. On 14 November 2017, Softbank agreed to invest $10 billion into Uber. On 29 December 2017, it was reported that a SoftBank-led consortium had invested $9 billion into Uber. The deal, to close in January 2018, would leave SoftBank as Uber's biggest shareholder, with a 15 percent stake. The deal was secured after Uber shareholders voted to "sell their shares to the Japanese conglomerate at a discounted price." Beyond SoftBank, consortium members included Dragoneer, Tencent, TPG and Sequoia.

On 14 January 2018, Softbank's Vision Fund announced to invest $560 million in the German used-car sales portal Auto1. On 1 March 2018, Softbank's Vision Fund led a $535 million investment in DoorDash. In May 2018, CEO Masayoshi Son revealed during an earnings presentation that Walmart had reached a deal to buy Flipkart. On 27 September 2018, Softbank announced the investment of $400 Million in Home-Selling Startup Opendoor.

In September 2018, Saudi government officials announced that a planned $200 billion project with SoftBank Group to build the world's biggest solar-power-generation project would be put on hold. In November 2018, SoftBank announced it would make an IPO of SoftBank Corp., the telecommunications operator, with the cost of share of $13.22 (which is 1,500 yen). The offer of the shares was going to last for a month. Regarding the number of shares, the total value of SoftBank Corp. will reach $21.15 billion, which would be the second-largest IPO ever made.

In December 2018, SoftBank invested in ParkJockey. The startup attempts to monetize parking lots. After the investment round, general valuation of the ParkJourney reached $1 billion.

In December 2018, SoftBank announced its intention to invest $1 billion on ride-hailing startup Grab. Some sources said that the total amount of investment could reach $1.5 billion.

2019–2021
On 25 September 2019, Softbank Robotics launched Whiz robotic vacuum cleaner in Singapore.

In September 2019, WeWork's IPO was canceled.

In December 2019, Softbank sold its interest in dog-walking startup Wag at a loss. Tadashi Yanai, Fast Retailing's CEO and Japan's richest man at the time, left the board after 18 years.

In January 2020, multiple Softbank-funded startups started cutting their staff, including Getaround, Oyo, Rappi, Katerra and Zume. In February 2020, Elliott Management, an activist hedge fund, bought a $2.5 billion stake in Softbank and pushed for restructuring and more transparency, especially regarding its Vision Fund. Consequently, plans for a second Vision Fund were pushed back.

In November 2019, it was announced that Line Corp. and Z Holdings were going to be a new subsidiary under Naver Corporation and SoftBank Group, their respective owners. The closing was delayed until March 2021 due to COVID-19.

In March 2020, SoftBank announced that it was launching an emergency ¥4.5tn ($41bn) asset sale to fund a share buyback and debt reduction. The effort was initiated by Son in order to stem a collapse in the company’s share price due to the pandemic, "This programme will be the largest share buyback and will result in the largest increase in cash balance in the history of SBG [SoftBank Group], reflecting the firm and unwavering confidence we have in our business.". After the programme was unveiled, Softbank share price rose almost 19%. The program included a plan to repurchase ¥2tn of its shares in addition to the ¥500bn buyback it promised 10 days prior. Combined, SoftBank would be repurchasing 45% of its stock.

On 1 April 2020, Sprint completed its merger with T-Mobile US, which was majority-owned by Deutsche Telekom, leaving T-Mobile the parent company. The merger also led to Softbank holding 24% of the new T-Mobile's shares, while 43% of shares are held by Deutsche Telekom. The remaining 33% will be held by others. In May 2020, Alibaba's co-founder and former CEO Jack Ma resigned from the board.

In July 2020, SoftBank announced that it is considering to sell or IPO British chip designer Arm Holdings, which has been in a feud with the Chinese over control of its local subsidiary, but it did not have the majority ownership due to a decision made by Softbank to sell off the stake to the local partner. For Q2 of 2020, the company revenues were $12 billion. The firm announced that it would be arranging a new fund worth $555 million. The fund will be used to invest in various companies, including Amazon, Apple and Facebook.

In September 2020, SoftBank Vision Fund 2 led a $100 million Series C round in Biofourmis. Also in September 2020, Softbank was identified as the Nasdaq whale where it bought stock options valued in the billions, betting on higher prices for the biggest technology companies. That month SoftBank sold Brightstar Corporation to Brightstar Capital Partners for an undisclosed amount.

American chip designing company Nvidia announced plans on 13 September 2020 to acquire ARM from SoftBank, pending regulatory approval, for a value of US $40 billion in stock and cash. This would become the largest semiconductor acquisition to date. SoftBank Group would retain a 10% share in the company while ARM would maintain its headquarters in Cambridge. But this deal collapsed due to regulatory hurdles.

In December 2020, Hyundai Motor Group acquired an 80% stake of Boston Dynamics from SoftBank for approximately $880 million. SoftBank retains about 20% through an affiliate.

In January 2021, SoftBank sold $2 billion in Uber Technologies shares through affiliate firm SB Cayman.

In March 2021, SoftBank made a record $36.99 billion profit from its Vision Fund unit and investment gains via the public market debut of Coupang. SoftBank Group's net profit was $45.88 billion (¥4.99 trillion). It was the largest recorded annual profit by a Japanese company in history. The same month, Softbank's Vision Fund 2 announced investment in the eToro SPAC merger PIPE funding of $650 million.

In April 2021 Softbank announced plans to acquire a 40% stake in AutoStore for $2.8 billion and in July 2021 it announced it would invest $870 million in the Korean hotel booking platform Yanolja.

In May 2021, Softbank stated it would sell SB Energy India, to Adani Green Energy, valuing the unit at $3.5 billion. The sale is speculated to mark a shift in the company's trajectory, moving away from investments in solar energy towards companies dealing with artificial intelligence. Later that month, Bloomberg reported, Vision Fund could go public via a $300 million SPAC in 2021, listing in Amsterdam.

In July 2021, Softbank announced that it would acquire the Yahoo Japan brand from Verizon for $1.6 billion.

In August 2021, Son said he would begin to make personal investments alongside Softbank Group's Vision Fund 2.

In September 2021, Softbank agreed to sell most of its shares in T-Mobile US to Deutsche Telekom in exchange for a 4.5% stake in the latter.

2022–present
In August 2022, Softbank said that it sold its entire Uber holdings in April–July 2022. It was also reported that Softbank exited Opendoor in that quarter. Five years after Masayoshi Son’s $100 billion fund entered the financial world to much fanfare, Softbank’s venture firm was crumbling and on the verge of collapse. Its large venture vehicles struggled badly, performing in the bottom of the asset class, and many of Son’s closest associates in the effort had departed from the company.

In February 2023, Toyota Tsusho announced that it had bought the controlling interest in SB Energy, which would become a subsidiary, alongside Toyota Tsusho subsidiary Eurus Energy.

Institutional ownership

2020
As of 30 September 2020, SoftBank ownership is as follows:
 Masayoshi Son (21.25%)
 The Master Trust Bank of Japan investment trusts (10.25%)
 Japan Trustee Services Bank main investment trusts (5.87%)
 JPMorgan Chase (7.45%)
 Citibank (1.4%)
 The Vanguard Group (2.19%)
 Capital Group Companies (2.4%)
 Baillie Gifford (1.36%)

2022
By December 2022, Masayoshi Son’s stake in the company he founded had risen to 34.2% from 32.2% as of the end of September.

Business units

SoftBank's corporate profile includes various other companies such as Japanese broadband company SoftBank BB, data center company IDC Frontier, gaming company GungHo Online Entertainment, and the publishing company SB Creative. SBI Group is a Japanese financial services company that began in 1999 as a branch of SoftBank. Ymobile Corporation is another telecommunications subsidiary of SoftBank, established in 2014. In 2010, SoftBank founded Wireless City Planning (WCP), a subsidiary that planned the development of TD-LTE networks throughout Japan. SoftBank also operates SoftBank Capital, a US-based venture capital company. SoftBank owns the Fukuoka SoftBank Hawks professional baseball team. SoftBank also operated in the eco-power industry through subsidiary SB Energy until its sale.

It has various partnerships in Japanese subsidiaries of foreign companies such as Yahoo! (which has resulted in Yahoo! Japan), E-Trade, Ustream.tv, EF Education First and Morningstar. It also has stakes in Alibaba Group and Sprint Corporation.

SoftBank Corp.
 is SoftBank's telecommunications subsidiary, providing both mobile and fixed-line services. It was called SoftBank Mobile until July 2015, when the Group merged SoftBank BB Corp., SoftBank Telecom Corp. and Ymobile Corporation to reflect its fixed-line and ISP operations.

J-PHONE

SoftBank's mobile communications arm began with the formation of Japan Telecom in 1984. The Digital Phone Group (デジタルホン, DPG, three local companies) mobile phone division was formed in 1994, and J-PHONE Co., Ltd. (J-フォン) was formed in 1999 by the DGP/ Digital TU-KA Group merger (DTG, six local companies, not to be confused with TU-KA). Japan Telecom owned a stake of 45.1%.

J-PHONE grew steadily for a decade by introducing new services and enhancements such as SkyWalker for PDC, SkyMelody ringtone download, the Sha-Mail picture mail introduced following camera phones developed by SHARP, the mobile multimedia data service J-Sky modeled after NTT DoCoMo's i-mode, and advanced Java services based on JSCL, modeled after NTT DoCoMo's DoJa based i-appli.

Vodafone
In October 2001, the British mobile phone group Vodafone increased its share to 66.7% of Japan Telecom and 69.7% of J-Phone. On 1 October 2003,  the company's name and the service brand changed to Vodafone, while the division was called Vodafone K.K. or Vodafone Japan.

However, in January 2005, Vodafone Japan lost 58,700 customers and in February 2005 lost 53,200 customers, while competitors NTT DoCoMo gained 184,400 customers, while Au by KDDI gained 163,700, and Willcom gained 35,000. While as of February 2005, DoCoMo's FOMA 3G service had attracted 10 million subscribers and KDDI's 3G service had attracted over 17 million subscribers, Vodafone's 3G service only attracted 527,300 subscribers. Vodafone 3G failed to attract subscribers because Vodafone reduced investments in 3G services in Japan in 2002/3; handsets did not fully match the needs and preferences of Japanese customers. At the end of February 2005, Vodafone Japan had 15.1 million customers. By the end of October 2005, the number of subscribers had fallen below 15M. During the same period, NTT DoCoMo gained 1.65 million customers, and KDDI/AU gained 1.82 million customers. Vodafone-Japan had only 4.8% of Japan's 3G market.

Vodafone changed the name of its multimedia data services from J-Sky to Vodafone live! and used J-Sky's principles, technologies, and business models to introduce the WAP-based Vodafone live! in Vodafone's other markets. At the end of February 2005, Vodafone live! had 12.907 million subscribers in Japan. By the end of October 2005, the number of Vodafone live! subscribers had fallen by 138,000.

In March 2006, Vodafone began discussing the sale of the Vodafone Japan unit to SoftBank. Vodafone was unable to satisfy customers. Handsets had user interfaces that differed too much from the Japanese interface and lacked competitive features.

SoftBank Mobile

On 17 March 2006, Vodafone Group announced it had agreed to sell Vodafone Japan to SoftBank for about US$15.1 billion. On 18 May 2006, the unit was renamed "SoftBank Mobile Corp.", effective 1 October 2006.

On 4 June 2008, SoftBank Mobile announced a partnership with Apple and brought the iPhone (3G) to Japan later in 2008. SoftBank Mobile was the only official carrier of the iPhone in Japan until the release of iPhone 4S in 2011, when au by KDDI began to offer it.

Technology
SoftBank Corp.'s mobile network operates W-CDMA (UMTS 3G) network ("SoftBank 3G"). SoftBank's 3G network is compatible with UMTS and supports transparent global roaming for UMTS subscribers from other countries.

Timeline

 1981: SoftBank Corp. (currently SoftBank Group Corp.) Japan (Yombancho, Chiyoda-ku, Tokyo) established. Commenced operations as a distributor of packaged software
 1984: Japan Telecom was founded.
 1986: Japan Telecom launches leased circuit services.
 1986: Railway Telecommunication established.
 1989: Railway Telecommunication merges with Japan Telecom.
 1991: Tokyo Digital Phone established.
 1994: J-Phone starts PDC cellular service in the 1.5 GHz band, 10 MHz bandwidth.
 1997: J-Phone launches SkyWalker SMS service designed by Aldiscon and Ericsson for PDC
 1998: J-Phone launches SkyMelody ringtone download service
 1999: J-Phone launches J-Sky wireless Internet service ten months after NTT DoCoMo's i-mode, which was launched in February 1999.
 2000: J-Phone launches Sha-Mail (写メール) picture messaging service using the world's first camera phones developed by SHARP
 2001: J-Phone launches Java service with JSCL library
 2002: J-Phone launches W-CDMA 3G service for the first time
 2002: Company name was changed to Japan Telecom Holdings. The fixed-line telecommunications business was also separated to found a new Japan Telecom.
 2003: J-Phone company name is changed to Vodafone K.K., and J-Sky name is changed to Vodafone live!. Vodafone launches a Japan-nationwide Beckham campaign
 2003: Company name was changed to Vodafone Holdings K.K.
 2004: Vodafone K.K. merges with Vodafone Holdings K.K. and the company name is changed to Vodafone K.K.
 2004: Vodafone relaunches the 3G services in Japan a second time offering mobile phone handsets designed primarily for the European markets
 2005: Vodafone changes management and relaunches 3G services in Japan a third time
 2006: Vodafone officially announced it had agreed to sell Vodafone Japan (Vodafone K.K.) to SoftBank for a total of 1.75 trillion Japanese yen (approx US$15.1 billion) in one of the largest M&A transactions in Japan to date
 2006: SoftBank and Vodafone K.K. jointly announced, that the name of the company will be changed to a "new, easy-to-understand and familiar" company name and brand. Masayoshi Son became CEO and Representative Director of Vodafone K.K.
 2006: Headquarters moved from Atago Hills to Shiodome to integrate operations with other SoftBank group companies.
 2006: SoftBank announced that the name of the company will be changed to "SoftBank Mobile Corp." effective 1 October 2006
 2006: SoftBank started rebranding "Vodafone" to "SoftBank."
 2006: Vodafone Japan company name is changed to "SoftBank Mobile Corp."
 2008: SoftBank Mobile releases iPhone in Japan beating NTT DoCoMo
 2008: SoftBank Mobile joins Open Handset Alliance
 2010: Softbank purchased 100% of the PHS mobile operator Willcom.
 2012: SoftBank Mobile unveils the Pantone 5 107SH, a mobile phone with a built-in geiger counter.
 2015: Investment in US-based Social Finance, Inc (SoFi) announced
 2015: SoftBank Mobile was merged with SoftBank BB Corp., SoftBank Telecom Corp., and Ymobile Corporation to form a new subsidiary, SoftBank Corp., to reflect its new status of providing fixed-line and ISP operations.
 2018: SoftBank Corp. (TSE: 9434) listed on the First Section of the Tokyo Stock Exchange On 19 December 2018.

Gallery

Marketing
Since May 2006, SoftBank's telecommunications marketing and commercials have principally revolved around "Otosan sujan karki", the canine patriarch of the otherwise human "Shirason, Kaito" family. "Otosan" translates to father, and the character, a Hokkaido dog, indeed acts as the father of the family, along with the son "Kojiro" (starred by Dante Carver), mom "Masako" (Kanako Higuchi), and daughter "Aya" (Aya Ueto). The advertising series proved to be popular: CM Research Center ranked the Otousan adverts as the most popular in Japan between 2007 and 2012, based on monthly surveys of 3,000 randomly selected adults.

SoftBank partnered with the Ingress augmented reality game, supporting the branded "SoftBank Ultra Link" in-game item.

Sponsorship
SoftBank bought a "team" for the America's Cup. The team was named SoftBank Team Japan, and Yanmar came on board. SoftBank Team Japan raced in the 2017 races held in Bermuda. The team members come from various backgrounds, most of whom were not Japanese.

The company was the official jersey sponsor of the Japanese national basketball team at the official 2017 Asian Basketball Championship in Lebanon as well as the 2019 FIBA World Cup.

SoftBank has also owned the Fukuoka SoftBank Hawks, a Japanese professional baseball team based in Fukuoka, since 2005.

Baby bonus
In 2015, SoftBank, along with some other companies in Japan, offered a baby bonus for employees who have children. The payments range from US$400 for a first child to US$40,000 for a fifth child.

Vision fund investments

SoftBank Investment Advisers oversees SoftBank's Vision Fund, created in 2017, which invests in emerging technologies like artificial intelligence, robotics and the internet of things. It intended to develop a portfolio of 125 AI companies. According to the fund and Son, it also invested in companies to revolutionize real estate, transportation, and retail. Son claimed he would make personal connections with the CEOs of all companies funded by Vision Fund in order to boost synergies among them. Son’s original plans were to raise $100 billion for a new fund every few years, investing about $50 billion a year in startups. By 2023, after the launch of Vision Fund 1 and 2, the dismal performance of SoftBank’s funds had cast a shadow over the initial exuberance of both Masayoshi Son and his company regarding its huge, largely unprofitable intercorporate  investments that had become the main mission, vision and purpose of the entire SoftBank Group.

SoftBank Ventures Asia 
SoftBank Ventures Asia (SBVA) is the global early-stage venture capital arm of the SoftBank Group The firm focuses on early-stage ICT investments – including Artificial Intelligence (AI), the internet of things (IoT), and smart robotics. By October 2021, SBVA has backed more than 250 companies in 10 countries with US$1.3 billion fund under management.

SoftBank Ventures Asia (SBVA) was founded in 2000 as SoftBank Ventures Korea and began its focus on South Korean market and its early-stage ventures. SBVA’s one of the early investments in South Korea includes Nexon Co, now a Korean-Japanese gaming publisher that was the largest IPO in Japan for 2011.

SoftBank Ventures Asia (SBVA) expanded its focus beyond South Korea since 2011 and made several notable investments in Southeast Asia, such as Tokopedia, an Indonesian e-commerce platform, and Carro, Singapore's used-car platform. In 2018, SBVA launched a $300m venture fund ‘China Venture Fund I’, targeting Chinese start-ups, then immediately trailed by ‘SoftBank Acceleration Fund’ with $300M the following year. With continuous investment across Asia and beyond, the company renamed itself as SoftBank Ventures Asia to reflect its broadened focus on startups in the Asia-Pacific region beyond South Korea, and opened offices in Seoul, Singapore, and Beijing.

With the company’s extended expertise in ICT investment, SBVA is aiming towards two investment themes, which are ‘technology innovation’ in AI, Robotics, Semiconductor, Mobility, and AR/VR, and ‘market innovation’ in consumer, enterprise, shared economy, healthcare, etc. SBVA created $160M ‘future innovation fund’ in March 2021, focusing on AI start-ups and made investment in AI sector including VoyagerX, AI software developer, Upstage AI, AI solution provider, and MarqVision, AI-powered intellectual property (IP) protection platform.

See also

List of conglomerates

References

Additional sources
.

External links

  (SoftBank Group)
  (SoftBank)

 
Telecommunications companies established in 1981
Retail companies established in 1981
Companies listed on the Tokyo Stock Exchange
Conglomerate companies of Japan
Conglomerate companies based in Tokyo
Internet service providers of Japan
Holding companies based in Tokyo
Japanese brands
Mass media companies of Japan
Mass media companies based in Tokyo
Mobile phone companies of Japan
Multinational companies headquartered in Japan
Telecommunications companies based in Tokyo
Telecommunications companies of Japan
Vodafone
2018 initial public offerings